Amy Paffrath (born July 22, 1983) is an American television presenter and actress.

Early life 
Paffrath was born in St. Louis on July 22, 1983 to Mark and Mary Paffrath.  She is the middle child of seven.  Her grandfather, Herman Paffrath, was also an actor.  While growing up, her family would put on plays and newscasts at family parties. Her mom enrolled her in ballet, tap and jazz class when she was just 3-years-old.

Paffrath attended the Missouri School of Journalism.  While there, she completed an internship at Entertainment Tonight in Los Angeles.  Paffrath earned her degree in Broadcast Journalism in 2005, and moved to Los Angeles in early 2006.

Career

Hosting 
From 2006 to 2007, Paffrath performed on-air reporting for Created by U and In the Mix, both on DirecTV.  In early 2007, she hosted her own pop culture news show, Broadcaster News on broadcaster.com.  Paffrath served as the longtime host of E! News Now; a red carpet correspondent for TV Guide's Hollywood 411; was a series regular on MSN's The Big Debate, and guest hosted on G4's Attack of the Show! and Fuel TV's The Daily Habit.

Paffrath hosted MTV’s Jersey Shore: After Hours and seasons 4-6 of Jersey Shore: Reunion. She appeared on The Girl Spot on BiteSize TV.  Paffrath was a red carpet correspondent for Yahoo! Movies.  She hosted Top Story! Weekly on Improv Olympics; and seasons one and two of the reality series, Dating Naked, on VH1. In 2015, Paffrath hosted the Mid-America Emmy Awards.

Acting 
Paffrath appeared in the films Moonlight on Ivy (2006), Fly Kidz (2006), and Dinner at Eight (2007), and played the lead in Huntsville (2007). She starred in Paramore's music video, "Misery Business", and Whitestarr's "Sunshine Girl".

Paffrath has acted in the American sitcoms Hot in Cleveland, Sullivan & Son, and 2 Broke Girls. In 2014, she appeared in the American film The Purge: Anarchy.

Spokesmodel 
Paffrath is the spokesmodel for Sibu Beauty Products.  She plays "Mayday Amy" in the Amazon Kindle "Fire" commercial campaign.

Personal life 
In April 2013, Paffrath married actor Drew Seeley. They have a daughter, born in July 2019.

Filmography

Film

Television

References

External links 
 

1983 births
21st-century American actresses
Actresses from St. Louis
American film actresses
American television actresses
American television hosts
American women television presenters
Living people